"Places" is a song by French DJ and record producer Martin Solveig featuring vocals from Norwegian singer/songwriter Ina Wroldsen. It was released as a digital download in France on 25 November 2016 through Spinnin' Records and Big Beat. The song has peaked at number 82 on the French Singles Chart. The song was written by Ina Wroldsen and Martin Picandet.

The song samples the Boy Meets Girl song "Waiting for a Star to Fall".

Music video
A music video to accompany the release of "Places" was first released onto YouTube on 7 December 2016 at a total length of four minutes and fourteen seconds.

Track listing

Charts

Weekly charts

Year-end charts

Certifications

Release history

References

2016 songs
2016 singles
Martin Solveig songs
Ina Wroldsen songs
Songs written by Ina Wroldsen
Songs written by Martin Solveig